Robert Witschge (born 22 August 1966) is a Dutch former professional footballer who played as a midfielder.

He spent most of his 14-year professional career with Feyenoord, but started out at Ajax, amassing Eredivisie totals of 281 matches and 39 goals.

Witschge represented the Dutch national team in the 1994 World Cup and Euro 1992.

Club career
Born in Amsterdam, North Holland, Witschge started his professional career with local AFC Ajax, being an undisputed starter at the age of 20 and a crucial element of the team that won the 1986–87 European Cup Winners' Cup. During three seasons, he shared teams with his sibling Richard.

Witschge joined French club AS Saint-Étienne in July 1989 but, unsettled, returned home in January 1991 with Feyenoord. He helped the Rotterdam side win three Dutch Cups, one Supercup and the 1992–93 Eredivisie.

After one weak final year with Feyenoord – 13 appearances, no goals – the 30-year-old moved to FC Utrecht, retiring in 1999 after one season with Saudi Arabia's Ittihad FC. In 2001 Witschge took up coaching, being named assistant of Marco van Basten and John van 't Schip at the national team in 2004; he rejoined the pair at Ajax four years later, again as assistant.

International career
Witschge made his debut for the Netherlands on 4 January 1989 in a friendly against Israel (2–0 away win), going on to win 30 caps (three goals) and represent the nation at UEFA Euro 1992 and the 1994 FIFA World Cup.

Personal life
Witschge's younger brother, Richard, is also a former footballer and a midfielder.

References

External links
Beijen profile 
Stats at Voetbal International 

1966 births
Living people
Footballers from Amsterdam
Dutch footballers
Association football midfielders
Eredivisie players
AFC Ajax players
Feyenoord players
FC Utrecht players
Ligue 1 players
AS Saint-Étienne players
Saudi Professional League players
Ittihad FC players
Netherlands under-21 international footballers
Netherlands international footballers
1994 FIFA World Cup players
UEFA Euro 1992 players
Dutch expatriate footballers
Expatriate footballers in France
Expatriate footballers in Saudi Arabia
Dutch expatriate sportspeople in France
Dutch expatriate sportspeople in Saudi Arabia
Dutch football managers